Garuchan (also Romanized as Garūchān) is a village in Jazmurian Rural District, Jazmurian District, Rudbar-e Jonubi County, Kerman Province, Iran.  In 2006, its population was 290 in 44 families.

References 

Populated places in Rudbar-e Jonubi County